Malaya Lewandowski (born April 13, 1988) is a singer, actress, VJ and a former beauty queen, of dual American and Filipino citizenship. She was also a member of Star Magic's defunct girl group Koolchx.

She previously hosted OMG and Music Bang in MYX North America.

Biography
Early life

Born on April 13, 1988 in San Francisco, California to a Filipina mother and an American father of German and Polish descent. Her name Malaya is from the Tagalog word "malaya", meaning "free".   Her mother was born on the 4th of July, the U.S. Independence Day.  She grew up in Fairfield, California.

She won a number of beauty contests in the United States, the last three being Ms. California Teen USA, Ms. Teen Filipina and Ms. Fiesta Filipina. She was discovered when she won as Miss Teen Filipina. A good singer, she was brought over to Manila to try her luck in Philippine showbiz.

Career

Malaya is currently under contract with ABS-CBN's Star Magic.   She regularly guested in ASAP and became part of TV specials of ABS-CBN. She has also appeared in Wowowee and Let's Go.   Her first regular stint was in Bora: Sons of the Beach.

She was part of the defunct all-girl group of Star Magic artists called Koolchx. She along with the rest of the Koolchx appeared on the cover of Maxim Philippines March 2008 issue. Her biggest break so far was being tapped to be a North America Myx VJ. She hosted two segments in Myx North America namely OMG and Music Bang.

Not Gabby Concepcion's Daughter

Between April and May 2008, Buzz station scoops about a love child of upcoming matinee idol, Gabby Concepcion.
According to the clues given by the entertainment website:  She is of Filipina-Polish descent.  Her half-sister has just joined showbiz.    And a member of the Koolchx.

All clues given by Buzz station seem to point to Malaya.  However, Lewandowski denied the reports, saying that she knew the actor since Gabby Concepcion is a family friend.  She also refused to talk about the controversies since she doesn't want the people to think that she's just using Concepcion to become popular.

Split up with Rafael Rosell

In 2009, news came out that Lewandowski and Rafael Rosell, who she dated for three years have split.   In the press conference of the film Status: Single, those in attendance were surprised to see when Rosell broke down in tears.  Rosell confirmed his split up with Lewandowski. In an April 2009 episode of The Buzz, Rosell gave details on the split up in an interview with Kris Aquino.

In January 2009, Lewandowski admitted to Rosell that he told the guy—a gym instructor at the gym where the couple goes—that she likes him.  According to Rosell, Malaya did not come clear about the reason of the breakup, but he deduced that she chose the other guy over him.

Still in the interview, Rosell revealed that he learned from friends that, in February Lewandowski and the unnamed guy started hanging out.   He also revealed that he received an e-mail from Lewandowski, who was 21 at that time, that she's marrying the guy. She got married, but separated after a few years.

Filmography

Notes

References

External links

Malaya Lewandowski @ MYX

1988 births
Living people
Star Magic
Filipino people of American descent
Filipino people of German descent
Filipino people of Polish descent
People from Fairfield, California